Socalchemmis dolichopus is a species of araneomorphae spider of the family Zoropsidae.

Distribution 

The species is endemic to California in the United States. It is found in the counties of Los Angeles, Orange, Riverside and San Bernardino.

Description 

Original publication 
 Chamberlin, 1919 : New Californian spiders. Journal of Entomology and Zoology, Claremont, .

References 

Zoropsidae
Fauna of California
Spiders of the United States
Spiders described in 1919